The 1938–39 Hong Kong First Division League season was the 31st since its establishment.

Overview
South China won the title.

References
RSSSF

Hong Kong First Division League seasons
Hong
First